Shorncliffe railway station is the terminus station of the Shorncliffe line in Queensland, Australia. It serves the Brisbane suburb of Shorncliffe.

History
The railway line from Brisbane to Sandgate opened in 1882, and the terminal station, located near Curlew Street, was named Sandgate. The line was extended to Shorncliffe in 1897, and the name Sandgate was transferred to the new terminal station. In 1938 it was renamed Shorncliffe.

The line allowed Brisbane residents to travel to the water of Moreton Bay's Shorncliffe shoreline. Beyond the station lie two sidings used to stable trains overnight.

Services
Shorncliffe is the terminus station for Shorncliffe line services to and from Roma Street, Cannon Hill, Manly and Cleveland.

Services by platform

References

External links

Shorncliffe station Queensland Rail
Shorncliffe station Queensland's Railways on the Internet
[ Shorncliffe station] TransLink travel information

Railway stations in Brisbane
Railway stations in Australia opened in 1882